The honey gourami (Trichogaster chuna) is a species of gourami native to India and Bangladesh.

Distribution and habitat 
The honey gourami is typically found in rivers and lakes in its native range of India and Bangladesh. It inhabits areas of thick vegetation in soft and poorly mineralised waters. This fish prefers the top and middle levels of the water.

Appearance and anatomy 
They have orange-colored bodies. This species can reach a length of  TL. Male specimens of this fish, typical of many gouramis, are generally more colourful than their female counterparts. They exhibit bright orange colouring around the throat region, which at breeding time becomes much brighter and is used to court the female. The undersides of the males become black when breeding. Males also exhibit somewhat of an orange tinge in their fins, with the exception of the caudal fin. The male also has longer fins, with a pointed dorsal fin and extended anal fin rays.
Two other color varieties have been selectively bred—a red-orange variety known as sunset or robin red, and a lighter variety called gold. This can sometimes lead to confusion, in part because the red-orange type can look like the red variety of dwarf gourami (Trichogaster lalia).

In the aquarium

The honey gourami is generally considered to be a non-aggressive community fish, ideal for small aquaria (10 gallons and up). However like other gouramis, male honey gouramis can be aggressive towards each other. For this reason they are best kept apart, unless the tank is large enough for the males to establish territories.  A tank that includes this fish should be planted and decorated to provide adequate cover. Providing cover is necessary as this species, like the similarly sized dwarf gourami, can be rather timid, and aggressive tankmates are best avoided. Good tankmates include non-fin nipping tetras, non-fin nipping barbs, corydoras, platys and other gouramis. Water temperature should be maintained at around 22-28 °C (71-82 °F). Water chemistry is not important, but extremes should be avoided.

A colour variant of the honey gourami is the red honey gourami, which is slightly redder in colour. When in breeding condition, the male becomes even darker red/orange in colour.

Breeding 
The honey gourami is a bubble nest builder that uses plants to help bind together the bubbles. The water level should be reduced to 8 in during spawning, and the temperature should be approximately 28 °C (82°F) and with a pH of around 7. It is always advised to keep your Gouramis in a separate tank to facilitate breeding. Make sure that the tank is covered. When ready to spawn, you will find the male building a small bubble nest in one end of your tank. It displays its color to grab the attention of its partner.

After the female approaches the male, it marks the start of the spawning process, which sees the male wrapping itself around the female. As they roll over each other, the eggs are expelled and fertilized at the same time.

Since the eggs slowly sink to the bottom of the tank, the male gathers them to put them into the nest. Unlike most other species, wherein the female takes on the dominant parenting role, here the male Honey Gourami assumes the guardian role at an early stage. The male continues guarding the nest, and rebuilds and repairs it if needed, while the female leaves the area. The eggs hatch after two days and the fry become free swimming three days later (Ter Morshuizen 2007). When they commence free swimming the fry should be fed infusoria, 10 days later brine shrimp, and 3 weeks later finely ground flakes. Freeze-dried tablets may also be fed to older fry.

References

External links 
Honey gourami page
Honey dwarf gourami fact sheet
gourami-fish.com/honey-species/

honey gourami
Fish of Bangladesh
Freshwater fish of India
honey gourami
honey gourami